James Scott, 1st Duke of Monmouth, 1st Duke of Buccleuch, KG, PC (9 April 1649 – 15 July 1685) was a Dutch-born English nobleman and military officer. Originally called James Crofts or James Fitzroy, he was born in Rotterdam in the Netherlands, the eldest illegitimate son of Charles II of England, Scotland, and Ireland with his mistress Lucy Walter.

The Duke of Monmouth served in the Second Anglo-Dutch War and commanded English troops taking part in the Third Anglo-Dutch War before commanding the Anglo-Dutch brigade fighting in the Franco-Dutch War. He led the unsuccessful Monmouth Rebellion in 1685, an attempt to depose his uncle King James II and VII. After one of his officers declared Monmouth the legitimate king in the town of Taunton in Somerset, Monmouth attempted to capitalise on his Protestantism and his position as the son of Charles II, in opposition to James, who had become a Roman Catholic. The rebellion failed, and Monmouth was beheaded for treason on 15 July 1685.

Biography

Parentage and early life

Charles, Prince of Wales (later becoming King Charles II), moved to The Hague in 1648, during the Second English Civil War, where his sister Mary and his brother-in-law William II, Prince of Orange, were based. The French relatives of Charles' mother, Queen Henrietta Maria, had invited Charles to wait out the war in France with the Queen, but he opted for the Netherlands, as he believed there was more support to be gained for the cause of his father, King Charles I, in the Netherlands than in France. During the summer of 1648, the Prince of Wales became captivated by Lucy Walter, who was in The Hague for a short visit. The lovers were only eighteen, and she is often spoken of as his first mistress, though he may have begun having affairs as early as 1646. Their son James was born in Rotterdam in the Netherlands on 9 April 1649, and spent his early years in Schiedam.

Research by Hugh Noel Williams suggests that Charles had not arrived in The Hague until the middle of September 1648 – seven months before the child's birth, and that he had only met Lucy in July. It was later rumoured that in the summer of 1648 Lucy had been the mistress of Colonel Robert Sidney, a younger son of the Earl of Leicester. As Charles had no legitimate surviving children, his younger brother James, Duke of York, was next in line to the throne. When the boy grew up, those loyal to the Duke of York spread rumours about the young James' resemblance to Sidney. These voices may have been encouraged by the Duke of York himself, who wished to prevent any of the fourteen royal bastards his brother acknowledged from gaining support in the succession. In 2012, a DNA test of Monmouth's patrilineal descendant the 10th Duke of Buccleuch showed that he shared the same Y chromosome as a distant Stuart cousin; this is evidence that Charles II was indeed Monmouth's father.

James had a younger sister or half-sister, Mary Crofts, whose father may have been Lord Taaffe. Mary later married the Irishman William Sarsfield, thus becoming the sister-in-law of the Jacobite general Patrick Sarsfield.

As an illegitimate son, James was ineligible to succeed to the English or Scottish thrones, unless he could prove rumours that his parents had married secretly. He came to maintain that his parents were married and that he possessed evidence of their marriage, but he never produced it. King Charles II testified in writing to his Privy Council that he had never been married to anyone except his queen consort, Catherine of Braganza.

In March 1658, young James was kidnapped by one of the King's men, sent to Paris, and placed in the care of William Crofts, 1st Baron Crofts, whose surname he took. He briefly attended a school in Familly.

Officer and commander

On 14 February 1663, almost 14 years old, shortly after having been brought to England, James was created Duke of Monmouth, with the subsidiary titles of Earl of Doncaster and Baron Scott of Tynedale, all three in the Peerage of England, and, on 28 March 1663, he was appointed a Knight of the Garter.

On 20 April 1663, just days after his 14th birthday, the Duke of Monmouth was married to the heiress Anne Scott, 4th Countess of Buccleuch. He took his wife's surname upon marriage. The day after his marriage, the couple were made Duke and Duchess of Buccleuch, Earl and Countess of Dalkeith, and Lord and Lady Scott of Whitchester and Eskdale in the Peerage of Scotland. The Duke of Monmouth was popular, particularly for his Protestantism. The King's official heir presumptive, James, Duke of York, had openly converted to Roman Catholicism.

In 1665, at the age of 16, Monmouth served in the English fleet under his uncle, the Duke of York, in the Second Anglo-Dutch War. In June 1666, he returned to England to become captain of a troop of cavalry. On 16 September 1668 he was made colonel of the His Majesty's Own Troop of Horse Guards. He acquired Moor Park in Hertfordshire in April 1670. Following the death in 1670, without a male heir, of Josceline Percy, 11th Earl of Northumberland, the earl's estates reverted to the Crown. King Charles II awarded the estates to Monmouth. The Countess of Northumberland successfully sued for the estates to be returned to the late Earl's only daughter and sole heiress, Lady Elizabeth Percy (1667–1722). 

At the outbreak of the Third Anglo-Dutch War in 1672, a brigade of 6,000 English and Scottish troops was sent to serve as part of the French army (in return for money paid to King Charles), with Monmouth as its commander. He became Lord Lieutenant of the East Riding of Yorkshire and Governor of Kingston-upon-Hull in April 1673. In the campaign of 1673 and in particular at the Siege of Maastricht that June, Monmouth gained a considerable reputation as one of Britain's finest soldiers. He was reported to be replacing Marshal Schomberg as commander of England's Zealand Expedition, but this did not happen.

In 1674, Monmouth became Chancellor of Cambridge University and Master of the Horse, and King Charles II directed that all military orders should be brought first to Monmouth for examination, thus giving him effective command of the forces; his responsibilities included the movement of troops and the suppression of riots. In March 1677, he also became Lord Lieutenant of Staffordshire.

Claim to the Crown

In 1678, Monmouth was the commander of the Anglo-Dutch brigade, now fighting for the United Provinces against the French, and he distinguished himself at the Battle of Saint-Denis in August that year during the Franco-Dutch War, further increasing his reputation. The following year, after his return to Britain, he commanded the small army raised to put down the rebellion of the Scottish Covenanters and despite being heavily outnumbered, he decisively defeated the (admittedly poorly equipped) Covenanter rebels at the Battle of Bothwell Bridge on 22 June 1679.

Rebellion

As his popularity with the masses increased, Monmouth was obliged to go into exile in the Dutch United Provinces in September 1679. Following the discovery of the so-called Rye House Plot in 1683, which aimed to assassinate both Charles II and his brother James, Monmouth, who had been encouraged by his supporters to assert his right to the throne, was identified as a conspirator. On King Charles II's death in February 1685, Monmouth led the Monmouth Rebellion, landing with three ships at Lyme Regis in Dorset in early June 1685, in an attempt to take the throne from his uncle, James II and VII. He published a "Declaration for the defence and vindication of the protestant religion and of the laws, rights and privileges of England from the invasion made upon them, and for delivering the Kingdom from the usurpation and tyranny of us by the name of James, Duke of York": King James II and VII responded to this by issuing an order for the publishers and distributors of the paper to be arrested.

Monmouth declared himself as the rightful King at various places along the route including Axminster, Chard, Ilminster and Taunton. The two armies met at the Battle of Sedgemoor on 6 July 1685, the last clear-cut pitched battle on open ground between two military forces fought on English soil: Monmouth's makeshift force could not compete with the regular army, and was soundly defeated.

Capture
Following the battle a reward of £5,000 was offered for his capture. On 8 July 1685, Monmouth was captured and arrested near Ringwood in Hampshire, by tradition "in a field of peas". The events surrounding his capture are described by George Roberts in Tait's Edinburgh Magazine.

When the Duke had left his horse at Woodyates Inn, he exchanged clothes with a shepherd, who was soon discovered by local loyalists and interrogated. Dogs were then put onto the Duke's scent. Monmouth dropped his gold snuff box, full of gold pieces, in a pea field, where it was afterwards found.

From Woodyates Inn the Duke had gone to Shag's Heath, in the middle of which was a cluster of small farms, called the "Island". Amy Farrant gave information that the fugitives were concealed within the Island. The Duke, accompanied by Busse and Brandenburgher, remained concealed all day, with soldiers surrounding the area and threatening to set fire to the woodland. Brandenburgher deserted him at 1 am, and was later captured and interrogated, and is believed to have given away the Duke's hiding place. The spot was at the north-eastern extremity of the Island, now known as Monmouth's Close, in the manor of Woodlands, the property of the Earl of Shaftesbury. At about 7 am Henry Parkin, a militia soldier and servant of Samuel Rolle, discovered the brown skirt of Monmouth's coat as he lay hidden in a ditch covered with fern and brambles under an ash tree, and called for help. The Duke was seized. Bystanders shouted out "Shoot him! shoot him!", but Sir William Portman happening to be near the spot, immediately rode up, and laid hands on him as his prisoner. Monmouth was then "in the last extremity of hunger and fatigue, with no sustenance but a few raw peas in his pocket. He could not stand, and his appearance was much changed. Since landing in England, the Duke had not had a good night's rest, or eaten one meal in quiet, being perpetually agitated with the cares that attend unfortunate ambition". He had "received no other sustenance than the brook and the field afforded".

The magistrate ordered him taken to London.

Attainder and execution

Following Monmouth's capture, Parliament passed an Act of Attainder, 1 Ja. II c. 2:

The King took the unusual step of allowing his nephew an audience, despite having no intention of extending a pardon to him, thus breaking with a longstanding tradition that the King would give an audience only when he intended to show clemency. The prisoner unsuccessfully implored his mercy and even offered to convert to Catholicism, but to no avail. The King, disgusted by his abject behaviour, coldly told him to prepare to die, and later remarked that Monmouth "did not behave as well as I expected". Numerous pleas for mercy were addressed to the King, but he ignored them all, even that of his sister-in-law, the Dowager Queen Catherine.

Monmouth was beheaded by Jack Ketch on 15 July 1685, on Tower Hill. Shortly beforehand, Bishops Turner of Ely and Ken of Bath and Wells visited the Duke to prepare him for eternity, but withheld the Eucharist, for the condemned man refused to acknowledge that either his rebellion or his relationship with Lady Wentworth had been sinful. It is said that before laying his head on the block, Monmouth specifically bade Ketch finish him at one blow, saying he had mauled others before. Disconcerted, Ketch did indeed inflict multiple blows with his axe, the prisoner rising up reproachfully the while – a ghastly sight that shocked the witnesses, drawing forth execrations and groans. Some say a knife was at last employed to sever the head from the twitching body. Sources vary; some claim eight blows, the official Tower of London fact sheet says it took five blows, while Charles Spencer, in his book Blenheim, puts it at seven.

Monmouth was buried in the Church of St Peter ad Vincula in the Tower of London. His Dukedom was forfeited, but his subsidiary titles, Earl of Doncaster and Baron Scott of Tindale, were restored by King George II on 23 March 1743 to his grandson Francis Scott, 2nd Duke of Buccleuch (1695–1751).

Popular legends
According to legend, a portrait was painted of Monmouth after his execution: the tradition states that it was realised after the execution that there was no official portrait of the Duke, so his body was exhumed, the head stitched back on, and it was sat for its portrait to be painted. However, there are at least two formal portraits of Monmouth tentatively dated to before his death currently in the National Portrait Gallery in London, and another painting once identified with Monmouth that shows a sleeping or dead man that could have given rise to the story.

One of the many theories about the identity of the Man in the Iron Mask is that he was Monmouth: the theory is that someone else was executed in his place, and James II arranged for Monmouth to be taken to France and put in the custody of his cousin Louis XIV of France.

Henry Purcell set to music (Z. 481) a satirical poem by an unidentified author, ridiculing Monmouth and his parentage:

Children

His marriage to Anne Scott, 1st Duchess of Buccleuch resulted in the birth of six children:
 Charles Scott, Earl of Doncaster (24 August 1672 – 9 February 1673/1674)
 James Scott, Earl of Dalkeith (23 May 1674 – 14 March 1705). He was married on 2 January 1693/1694 to Henrietta Hyde, daughter of Laurence Hyde, 1st Earl of Rochester. They were parents to Francis Scott, 2nd Duke of Buccleuch.
 Lady Anne Scott (17 February 1675 – 13 August 1685)
 Henry Scott, 1st Earl of Deloraine (1676 – 25 December 1730)
 Francis Scott (died an infant; buried 8 December 1679)
 Lady Charlotte Scott (died an infant; buried 5 September 1683)

His affair with his mistress Eleanor Needham, daughter of Sir Robert Needham of Lambeth resulted in the birth of three children:
 James Crofts (died March 1732), major-general in the Army.
 Henrietta Crofts ( – 27 February 1730). She was married around 1697 to Charles Paulet, 2nd Duke of Bolton.
 Isabel Crofts (died young)

Toward the end of his life he conducted an affair with Henrietta, Baroness Wentworth.

Family tree

References

Sources

Further reading

 
 
 
 

|-

|-

|-

|-

|-

1649 births
1685 deaths
17th-century English nobility
17th-century Scottish peers
British Life Guards officers
Chancellors of the University of Cambridge
101
English generals
English Protestants
Executed English people
Executed royalty
J
James
Illegitimate children of Charles II of England
Knights of the Garter
Lord-Lieutenants of Staffordshire
Lord-Lieutenants of the East Riding of Yorkshire
Lords of the Admiralty
Members of the Privy Council of England
Military personnel from Rotterdam
People executed under the Stuarts for treason against England
Dukes in the Peerage of England
English politicians convicted of crimes
People executed by Stuart England by decapitation
Executed Dutch people
People convicted under a bill of attainder
Executions at the Tower of London
Pretenders to the English throne
Pretenders to the Scottish throne
Prisoners in the Tower of London
Man in the Iron Mask
Monmouth Rebellion
Peers of England created by Charles II
Peers of Scotland created by Charles II
Sons of kings